Paratarpon is an extinct genus of prehistoric bony fish that lived during the Campanian.

See also

 Prehistoric fish
 List of prehistoric bony fish

References

Late Cretaceous fish
Elopidae
Fossils of Canada